Ondřej Perušič (born 26 September 1994) is a Czech beach volleyball player. He competed in the 2020 Summer Olympics.

References

External links
 
 
 
 

1994 births
Living people
Beach volleyball players at the 2020 Summer Olympics
Czech beach volleyball players
Olympic beach volleyball players of the Czech Republic
Sportspeople from Prague